Nick Walker (born 4 August 1973) is an English former professional snooker player from Chester. He turned professional in 1991, and reached the last 16 of three world ranking events before his retirement in 2005. He played 14 seasons as a professional and his highest professional break was 144, in the 2002 Welsh Open. His largest prize winning for one season was £45,710.

References

External links
Profile on worldsnooker.com 
Profile on globalsnooker.co.uk

1973 births
Living people
English snooker players
Sportspeople from Chester